Keith Scott may refer to:

 Keith Scott (voice actor) (born 1953), Australian voice actor, impressionist and animation historian
 Keith Scott (musician) (born 1954), Canadian guitar player
 Keith Scott (footballer) (born 1967), former professional footballer
 Keith Scott (One Tree Hill), character on the American TV series 
 Keith Lamont Scott (1973–2016), an African-American fatally shot by police in 2016 in North Carolina